Princess Frederica or Princess Frederika may refer to:

Princess Frederica Amalia of Denmark (1649–1704), duchess consort of Holstein-Gottorp, wife of Duke Christian Albrecht of Holstein-Gottorp
Frederica Louisa of Hesse-Darmstadt (1751–1805), queen consort and second wife of King Frederick William II of Prussia
Princess Frederica Charlotte of Prussia (1767–1820), daughter of King Frederick William II of Prussia and wife of Prince Frederick, Duke of York and Albany
Frederica of Mecklenburg-Strelitz (1778–1841), wife of King Ernest Augustus I of Hanover
Frederica of Baden (1781–1826), queen consort of King Gustav IV Adolf of Sweden
Princess Frederica of Prussia (1796–1850), daughter of Prince Louis Charles of Prussia and wife of Leopold IV, Duke of Anhalt-Dessau
Princess Frederica of Hanover (1848–1926), daughter of George V of Hanover and wife of Baron Alfons von Pawel-Rammingen
Frederica of Hanover (1917–1981), queen consort of King Paul of Greece

Princess Friederike may refer to:

Princess Friederike Luise of Prussia (1714–1784), daughter of King Frederick William I of Prussia and wife of Karl Wilhelm Friedrich, margrave of Brandenburg-Ansbach
Princess Friederike of Hesse-Darmstadt (1752–1782), daughter of Landgrave George William of Hesse-Darmstadt and wife of Charles II, grand duke of Mecklenburg-Strelitz
Princess Friederike of Schleswig-Holstein-Sonderburg-Beck (1780–1862), daughter of Friedrich Karl Ludwig, Duke of Schleswig-Holstein-Sonderburg-Beck
Princess Friederike of Schleswig-Holstein-Sonderburg-Glücksburg (1811–1902), daughter of Duke Friedrich Wilhelm of Schleswig-Holstein-Sonderburg-Glücksburg

See also
Caroline of Baden, Frederica Caroline Wilhelmina, Electress and later first Queen of Bavaria
 Friederike of Hanover (disambiguation)